Rolando Ephraim McLean (born 1 October 1970), better known as Yami Bolo, is a Jamaican reggae singer.

Biography
Yami Bolo grew up in postal zone 13 of Kingston. His first professional job and exposure was with Sugar Minott's Youth Promotion Crew. His first singles were released in 1986, produced by Minott, and he had his greatest success working with Augustus Pablo in the late 1980s and early 1990s, on singles such as "Struggle in Babylon". In 1994, Bolo earned international acclaim from his collaboration with Japanese reggae performer, Kazafumi Mizayawa (Miya). Their Love Is Dangerous album sold 500,000 units in Japan. In addition, the duo's "Miya-Yami Project" earned the Japanese "Best Music Video '94" title.

He contributed to Damian Marley's 2001 Grammy Award winning album Halfway Tree (2002 Best Reggae Album).

Bolo has collaborated with some of reggae's most prominent artists and producers; including Damian Marley, Tenor Saw, Sugar Minott, Capleton, Tapper Zukie, Sly and Robbie, and King Jammy's Studios. His success as a reggae artist has allowed him to record many songs professing the Rastafarian faith as taught by the Ethiopian Orthodox Church throughout his three decades in the reggae industry. Yami Bolo has been performing Rastafarian works since the mid-1980s touring with many different reggae groups including Augustus Pablo's Rockers crew.

His Rastafarian inspired music is listened to around the world, particularly in reggae niche markets like Japan, Australia, Britain, France, USA and Germany. As an ambassador for reggae, Yami Bolo conducted Rastafari cultural studies at world-renowned universities, like SUNY in New York State and MIT in Cambridge, Massachusetts. In addition, Yami Bolo has supported the city of New Orleans and its surrounding areas by volunteering his musical talent at live performances in Louisiana in the Summer of 2009.

In 2014 he was reportedly recording a new album, to be called The Singer.

Discography
Albums

 Jah Made Them All (Rockers, 1990)
 He Who Knows It Feels It (Heartbeat, 1991)
 Up Life Street (Heartbeat, 1992)
 Fighting for Peace (RAS, 1994)
 Wonders and Sign (Super Power, 1997)
 Wisdom Cry (IMAJ, 1998)
 No Surrender (Jet Star Records, 1998)
 Jah Love (VP Records, 1998)
 Freedom and Liberation (Tabou 1, 1999)
 Healing of All Nations (Roots Foundation, 2001)

EPs
 Blood Diamonds Dub Set (Gold Moor Sound, 2008)

Singles
 "Blood Diamonds" (Gold Moor Sound, 2008)
 "Bloody Coltan" (Gold Moor Sound, 2011)

See also
 List of reggae musicians

References

External links
 
 Yami Bolo discography at Discogs
 Blood Diamonds Dub Set official web site
 Blood Diamonds official web site
 Bloody Coltan official web site

1970 births
Living people
Musicians from Kingston, Jamaica
Jamaican reggae musicians
VP Records artists